The 2009 Team Long Track World Championship was the third annual FIM Team Long Track World Championship. The final took place on 16 August 2009 in Eenrum, Netherlands.  The championship was won by the defending champion Germany who beat a host team Netherlands in a final heat. France finished third.

Results
  Eenrum, "Sportpark Eenrum" (Length: 625 m)
 16 August 2009 (13:30 UTC+1)
 Referee:  Istvan Darago
 Jury President:  Wolfgang Glas

Heat details

See also
 2009 Individual Long Track World Championship
 2009 Speedway World Cup

References

Team Long Track World Championship
Team Long Track World Championship, 2009
Longtrack
Motorsport competitions in the Netherlands
Sports competitions in Groningen (province)
Sport in Het Hogeland